Starpoint Electric was an American alternative rock band from Chapel Hill, North Carolina. Formed in the fall of 1997, the band consisted of Ted Boyer (guitar/vocals), Clay Boyer (bass/vocals), Steve Galloway (guitar), and Cameron Weeks (drums). Weeks later founded a new band, the Buttons, with Rafi Goldberg of Grasshopper Highway and David Alston of Sticky. Their only full-length album, Bad Directions, was released in 1999 by Plastique Recording Company. It was recorded and mixed with John Morand, who is known for his work with Cracker and Sparklehorse. Prior to the release of Bad Directions, they had released a 7-inch single and a split EP, and toured with the Archers of Loaf. Kati Schardl described the album as "replete with dark pop beauty."

Discography
Bad Directions (Plastique Recording Company, 1999)

References

Musical groups from Chapel Hill-Carrboro, North Carolina
Musical groups established in 1997
Alternative rock groups from North Carolina
1997 establishments in North Carolina